Chikoy may refer to:
Chikoy (rural locality), a former urban-type settlement in the Republic of Buryatia, Russia; since 2004—a rural locality (a selo)
Chikoy (river), a river in Zabaykalsky Krai and the Republic of Buryatia in Russia